Ernie Gillon is an Australian former professional rugby league footballer who played as a  for Parramatta and Penrith in the 1960s and 1970s. Gillon was a foundation player for Penrith and played in the club's first ever game.

Playing career
Gillon played in the 1964 third grade team that won Parra’s first ever premiership. He made his first grade debut for Parramatta in 1966 and played 16 times for the club in his only season there.  In 1967, Gillon made the switch to newly admitted side Penrith and played in the club's first ever game which was a 15–12 defeat against Canterbury.  Gillon played with Penrith for the next 3 seasons as the club struggled near the bottom of the ladder narrowly avoiding the wooden spoon.  Gillon retired at the end of 1970.

References

Parramatta Eels players
Penrith Panthers players
Australian rugby league players
Rugby league players from Parramatta
Rugby league centres
Year of birth missing